The Libyan A' national football team is the national football team of Libya and is open only to domestic league players. The team won the 2014 African Nations Championship in South Africa.

The primary men's Libya national football team contains expatriate players and represents Libya at the Africa Cup of Nations.

African Nations Championship record

References

External links

Libya national football team
Libya